Pietro Ghislandi (born 19 April 1957 in Bergamo) is an Italian actor.

History
He was introduced to the public as a ventriloquist and was a finalist in the 1986/87 edition of the RaiUno program Fantastico 7 with his dummy Sergio. In 1985 he worked as a stand-in for Renato Pozzetto in the movie È arrivato mio fratello. Immediately after, he had a small part in Grandi magazzini and performed in many commercials. In 1987 in Soldati – 365 all’alba, he played a gay recruit. Thanks to his expressive skills and to his surreal acting, similar to the already mentioned Renato Pozzetto, Ghislandi has been often been asked to play roles as character actor, working both in the cinema and on television, without until recently getting lead roles. He boasts roles in important films like Il muro di gomma of Marco Risi, I mitici – Colpo gobbo a Milano of Carlo Vanzina, Vajont and Porzûs of Renzo Martinelli and, recently, was one of the actors chosen by Leonardo Pieraccioni in his successful movies (Il principe e il pirata, Il paradiso all’improvviso and Ti amo in tutte le lingue del mondo).
Pietro Ghislandi is known to the general public for being the one and only Italian ventriloquist. His comic quality is a bit fanciful and nonstandard for television cabaret comedy. Voice is an important element of his show entitled "The left ventriculus" that is on tour through Italy. His "vocal" experiences include the well-known cartoonist Bruno Bozzetto and the dubbing of the most famous characters of the Italian "Walt Disney". He is also known for his roles in two national commercials. (Acqua Uliveto with Alessandro Del Piero and Caffè Kimbo with Gigi Proietti).

Filmography
Sandwich, directed by Bruno Bozzetto (1984)
È arrivato mio fratello, directed by Castellano e Pipolo (1985)
Spider, directed by Bruno Bozzetto (1985)
Grandi magazzini, directed by Castellano e Pipolo (1986)
Soldati - 365 all'alba, directed by Marco Risi (1987)
Piccole stelle, directed by Nicola Di Francescantonio (1988)
Una fredda mattina di maggio, directed by Vittorio Sindoni (1990)
I segreti professionali del Dott.Apfeldluck, directed by Alessandro Capone (1990)
Il muro di gomma, directed by Marco Risi (1991)
Cattiva, directed by Carlo Lizzani (1991)
Mutande pazze, directed by Roberto D'Agostino (1992)
Anni 90, directed by Enrico Oldoini (1992)
The Heroes, directed by Carlo Vanzina (1994)
Belle al bar, directed by Alessandro Benvenuti (1994)
Palla di neve, directed by Maurizio Nichetti (1995)
Un paradiso di bugie, directed by Stefania Casini (1996)
Luna e l'altra, directed by Maurizio Nichetti (1996)
Porzûs, directed by Renzo Martinelli (1997)
Frigidaire - Il film, directed by Giorgio Fabris (1998)
Figli di Annibale, directed by Davide Ferrario (1998)
Boom, directed by Andrea Zaccariello (1999)
Screw Loose, directed by Ezio Greggio (1999)
Doctor Ghiss, directed by Bruno Bozzetto (1999)
Vajont - La diga del disonore, directed by Renzo Martinelli (2001)
Il principe e il pirata, directed by Leonardo Pieraccioni (2001)
Piazza delle cinque lune, directed by Renzo Martinelli (2003)
Il paradiso all'improvviso, directed by Leonardo Pieraccioni (2003)
In questo mondo di ladri, directed by Carlo Vanzina (2004)
Ti amo in tutte le lingue del mondo, directed by Leonardo Pieraccioni (2005)
I quattro aspiranti, directed by Daniele Lunghini (2005)
Quattro quattro due, il gioco più bello del mondo, directed by Roan Occam Anthony Johnson (2006)
Ombre, directed by Alberto Meroni (2008)
Un'estate ai Caraibi, directed by Carlo Vanzina (2009)
Comete com te, directed by Beppe Manzi (2010)
Leone nel basilico, regia di Leone Pompucci (2012)
La gente che sta bene, regia di Francesco Patierno (2013)

Television
Cartoni Magici, RaiUno, directed by Sergio Tau (1984)
Cartoni Magici, RaiUno, directed by Luigi Martelli (1985)
Fantastico 7, RaiUno, directed by Gino Landi (1986)
Chi tiriamo in ballo, RaiDue, directed by Roberto Poppi (1987)
La trappola, Canale5, directed by Carlo Lizzani (1988)
Colletti bianchi, Canale5, directed by Bruno Cortini (1988)
Conto su di te, RaiDue, directed by Carlo Nistri (1989)
Palmitalia 90, RTSI, directed by Mauro Regazzoni (1990)
La Palmita, RTSI, directed by Sandro Pedrazzetti (1991)
La Tombola, RTSI, directed by Mauro Regazzoni (1991)
Piacere Raiuno, ReteQuattro, directed by Mimma Nocelli (1991)
Quattro salti nel '92, ReteQuattro, directed by Egidio Romio (1992)
Cercando cercando, RaiDue, directed by Rosario Montesanti (1995)
Una volta al mese, Canale5, directed by Gino Landi (1997)
Amici miei, RTSI, directed by Maristella Polli (1998)
Io e la mamma, Canale5, directed by Fosco Gasperi (1998)
Maurizio Costanzo Show, Canale5, directed by Paolo Pietrangeli (1998)
Affare fatto, Canale5, directed by Luisa Alluigi (1998)
Casa Vianello, Canale5, directed by Fosco Gasperi (1998)
Scomparsi, Canale5, directed by Claudio Bonivento (1998)
Nebbia in val Padana, RaiUno, directed by Felice Farina (1999)
Casa Vianello, Canale5, directed by Fosco Gasperi (1999)
Striscia la notizia, Canale5, directed by Roberta Bellini (2000)
Estatissima sprint, Canale5, directed by Roberta Bellini (2000)
Casa Vianello, Canale5, directed by Fosco Gasperi (2001)
Speriamo che sia maschio, Canale5, directed by Giorgio Bardelli (2001)
Don Luca, Canale5, directed by Marco Maccaferri (2002)
Rocco, Canale5, directed by Nicolò Bongiorno (2003)
La stagione dei delitti, RaiDue, directed by Claudio Bonivento (2003)
La fuga degli innocenti, RaiUno, directed by Leone Pompucci (2004)
L'avvocato, RTSI, directed by Alessandro Maccagni (2004)
Il grande Torino, RaiUno, directed by Claudio Bonivento (2004)
Gino Bartali, l'uomo d'acciaio, RaiUno, directed by Alberto Negrin (2005)
Un ciclone in famiglia, Canale5, directed by Carlo Vanzina (2005)
Nati ieri, Canale5, directed by Carmine Elia (2006)
Spam, MTV, directed by Paolo Angelici (2007)
Stasera mi butto, RaiUno, directed by Roberto Cenci (2008)
Ris 5, Canale5, directed by Cristian De Mattheis (2009)
Piloti, RaiDue, directed by Celeste Audisio (2009)
Il sogno del maratoneta, RaiUno, directed by Leone Pompucci (2010)
Io e Margherita, TV Studio1, regia di Silvia Arzuffi (2011)
Il nostro amico Walter, RaiUno, regia di Enzo Monteleone (2011)
Anita, RaiUno, regia di Claudio Bonivento (2011)

Theater
Satie e il gruppo dei Sei, directed by Giacomo De Sanctis (1980)
I Litiganti of Racine, directed by Umberto Verdoni (1981)
Doctor Faust of Marlow, directed by Giancarlo Valenti (1982)
Student of Ryszard Cieslak, the actor of Grotowski (1984)Fantastico in tour, directed by Gino Landi (1987)Sconcerto, directed by Pietro Ghislandi and Roberto Frattini (1997)La voce interna, directed by Asta Gröting (1998)Prova d'orchestra with the great orchestra "Donizetti" and the pianist Lylian Zilberstein(2002)L'ultimo burattino directed by Rino Denti with the orchestra "Astori" (2003)Suonar Canzoni with Gianni Bergamelli and Gianluigi Trovesi (2005)Pierino e il lupo with the Orchestra Sinfonica di Lecco headed by Savino Acquaviva (2006)Tutti quanti voglion fare il jazz with the Latin Jazz Orchestra "Hermano Pedro" directed by Maurizio Carugno (2007)Masterclass con Gino Vannelli with the international singer Gino Vannelli (2007)John Coltrane, A Love Supreme with Gabriele Comeglio and Franco Ambrosetti (2009)Tre piccole suite a forma di Pierrot with Marco Remondini, Stefano Bertoli and Gianluigi Trovesi (2010)Pierino e il lupo with the Orchestra Sinfonica di Parma headed by Luciano Caggiati (2010)Un ventriloquo al circo Ospite del Circo Folloni nella tournée in Lombardia (2012)Scurricula Protagonista della conferenza-spettacolo per l'Università degli Studi di Bergamo nella rassegna ”Orientamento, stage & placament" directed by Lorenzo Locatelli (2012)Il gatto con gli stivali Protagonista della favola musicale di Charles Perrault with the "Banda S. Cecilia" di Borno (BS) headed by Tomaso Fenaroli (2012)The jazz singer''  Protagonista del concerto-spettacolo con la Big Band "CDPM" di Bergamo directed by Sergio Orlandi (2013)

1957 births
Living people
Italian male actors
Actors from Bergamo
Ventriloquists